
Faye may refer to:

Places
 Faye, Loir-et-Cher, France, a village
 Faye-d'Anjou, France, a village
 La Faye, France, a village
 Faye, Kentucky, Elliott County, Kentucky, United States
 Faye (crater), a lunar impact crater in the southern highlands of the Moon

People and fictional characters
 Faye (given name), including a list of people and fictional characters
 Faye (surname), including a list of people

 Faye (musician), stage name of Swedish singer, songwriter, and model Fanny Matilda Dagmar Hamlin (born 1987)
 Faye (Taiwanese singer), member of the Taiwanese band F.I.R.

Other uses
 Hurricane Faye (1975)
 4P/Faye, a periodic comet discovered in 1843 by Hervé Faye

See also
 Fay (disambiguation)
 Fey (disambiguation)